The town of Vilas is a Statutory Town located in Baca County, Colorado, United States. The population was 114 at the 2010 census.

A post office called Vilas has been in operation since 1887. The community was named after William Freeman Vilas, a United States Senator
from Wisconsin.

Geography
Vilas is located in east-central Baca County at  (37.374134, -102.446928). U.S. Route 160 passes just to the north of the town, leading west  to Springfield, the county seat, and east  to Walsh.

Demographics

As of the census of 2000, there were 110 people, 45 households, and 31 families residing in the town. The racial makeup of the town was 93.64% White, 3.64% Native American, and 2.73% from two or more races. Hispanic or Latino of any race were 13.64% of the population.

There were 45 households, out of which 26.7% had children under the age of 18 living with them, 53.3% were married couples living together, 11.1% had a female householder with no husband present, and 31.1% were non-families. 26.7% of all households were made up of individuals, and 8.9% had someone living alone who was 65 years of age or older. The average household size was 2.44 and the average family size was 2.94.

In the town, the population was spread out, with 21.8% under the age of 18, 12.7% from 18 to 24, 21.8% from 25 to 44, 22.7% from 45 to 64, and 20.9% who were 65 years of age or older. The median age was 40 years. For every 100 females, there were 96.4 males. For every 100 females age 18 and over, there were 104.8 males.

The median income for a household in the town was $34,167, and the median income for a family was $41,250. Males had a median income of $33,750 versus $55,417 for females. The per capita income for the town was $15,198. There were no families and 6.0% of the population living below the poverty line, including no under eighteens and 6.1% of those over 64.

See also

 Outline of Colorado
 Index of Colorado-related articles
 State of Colorado
 Colorado cities and towns
 Colorado municipalities
 Colorado counties
 Baca County, Colorado

References

External links

 CDOT map of the Town of Vilas

Towns in Baca County, Colorado
Towns in Colorado